Elsbeth von Nathusius (17 January 1846 - 10 July 1928) was a  German story writer.

Life 
Elsbeth Luise Friederike von Nathusius was born in Königsborn, a small but prosperous village near Magdeburg in central northern Germany.  She was one of six children born to the gentleman-farmer and high-profile oologist Wilhelm von Nathusius (1821-1899) by his marriage to Marie von Meibom (1820–1878).    A younger brother, Wilhelm von Nathusius (1856-1937), became an army officer.   Her sister, Susanne von Nathusius (1850-1929) became a successful portrait artist in Halle.   Elsbeth herself remained unmarried and had no children.

Evidence of Elsbeth charms as a small child comes from the poet and writer of children's songs, August Heinrich Hoffmann von Fallersleben, who visited her father in 1847 and dedicated twelve songs (including "For Elsbeth Nathusius") to the infant in a volume published under the title "The Elsbeth Album".   She continued to live at the family home as a young adult and in 1890 relocated with her widowed father to Halle where she remained for two years.   Later, in 1912, she moved to Kassel, living initially in a guest house and later with her younger brother, Wilhelm and his English-born wife, and then moving into a "women's residence" in the city's Wilhelmshöhe quarter.

During the 1880s, using the pseudonym F.L.Born, Nathusius published stories in Daheim, a well-regarded fortnightly "Family magazine".   Later books appeared under her name, such as "Erinnerungen an Johanne Nathusius" ("Memories of Johanne Nathusius") which concerned her formidable aunt, Johanne Philippine Nathusius.   Another was "Johann Gottlob Nathusius. Ein Pionier deutscher Industrie" (... a pioneer of German industry).   This time the subject was her grandfather.   There were also articles about Philippine Engelhard. her great grandmother.

Her savings were destroyed by the great inflation after which she lived in greatly reduced circumstances.   Elsbeth von Nathusius died of Pneumonia in the summer of 1928 at the care home in Merxhausen.

Output (selection)

Using a pseudonym in Daheim 

Unser Neffe, 8 part series, 1886
Dorothee, 3 part series (vols 35-37), 1887
Zum dritten Male, 5 part series (vols 27-31), 1888

Using her own name 

Alte Märchen. Den Kindern neu erzählt (Old fairy tales retold for children), illustrated by Otto Fikentscher, Gebauer-Schwetschke, Halle/Saale 1903, 1904, 1905, 1906 und 1910
Erinnerungen an Johanne Nathusius, Gebauer-Schwetschke, Halle/Saale ca. 1905
Johann Gottlob Nathusius. Ein Pionier deutscher Industrie, Deutsche Verlags-Anstalt, Stuttgart & Berlin ca. 1912
Philippine Gatterer, in: Hessenland, Nr. 33, 1919
Philippine Engelhard. Eine deutsche Dichterin aus der guten alten Zeit

References 

1846 births
1928 deaths
19th-century German women writers
20th-century German women writers
Collectors of fairy tales
Writers from Magdeburg
Deaths from pneumonia in Germany